Joan Capdevila Méndez (born 3 February 1978) is a Spanish former professional footballer who played as a left back.

Over 15 seasons in La Liga, he amassed totals of 410 matches and 36 goals, mainly for Deportivo and Villarreal. In a 21-year senior career, he also played professionally in Portugal, India, Belgium, and Andorra.

Capdevila won 60 caps for Spain, and was part of the squads which won Euro 2008 and the 2010 World Cup.

Club career

Early years and Deportivo
Born in Tàrrega, Lleida, Catalonia, and a product of RCD Espanyol's youth system, Capdevila started playing football as a forward, and he made his debut for its first team during the 1998–99 season in a 2–2 La Liga draw at Athletic Bilbao. He joined Atlético Madrid the following year.

After the Colchoneros relegation, Capdevila signed with Deportivo de La Coruña in the summer of 2000, and would be a regular fixture in the team as left-back, first competing with Enrique Romero then as the undisputed first choice. On 16 September 2006, he scored twice as the Galicians overcame Villarreal CF 2–0 at the Riazor Stadium.

Villarreal

For the 2007–08 campaign, Capdevila moved to Villarreal on a three-year deal, and played in all the league games except two for a side that finished runners-up, achieving direct qualification to the UEFA Champions League. He produced similar numbers in his second year, bettering his goal total in the process (five).

In the 2009–10 season, with no real competition for his position, Capdevila continued to figure prominently, only missing one league match – the defender added another five goals, but his team could not qualify for the UEFA Europa League this time after finishing seventh. On 6 December 2009 he scored twice in a 3–2 home win against Getafe CF, precisely the side that prevented the Valencians from reaching that achievement, even though they were later reinstated at the expense of RCD Mallorca.

Midway through 2010–11, Capdevila faced stiff competition from José Catalá, even being relegated to the bench on occasion. He did finish the campaign with more than 40 official appearances, including nine in Villarreal's Europa League semi-final run, where he scored in a 3–2 home victory over eventual winners FC Porto (7–4 aggregate loss).

Benfica
On 21 July 2011, aged 33, Capdevila moved abroad for the first time, joining S.L. Benfica of Portugal on a two-year contract. On 20 August he made his official debut in a 3–1 Primeira Liga defeat of C.D. Feirense at the Estádio da Luz, but was not included in the squad for the group stages of the Champions League, which prompted rumours that he would seek to leave in the January transfer window. Manager Jorge Jesus confirmed that another newly signed, Brazilian Emerson, would start at left-back and that the Spaniard would find it difficult to be included in matchday squads.

However, during the final stages of the season, Jesus gave Capdevila a long run as a starter, and he made his Champions League debut for the Lisbon club on 4 April 2012, playing the second leg of the quarter-finals against Chelsea, a 2–1 loss at Stamford Bridge (3–1 on aggregate). He was also the habitual first-choice during the domestic League Cup, which Benfica won for the fourth time in a row, and finished the campaign with 12 competitive matches.

Later years
On 27 July 2012, Capdevila agreed on a return to his first professional club Espanyol. He was released alongside Simão Sabrosa on 22 May 2014, after only ten overall appearances in his second season.

On 16 July 2014, Capdevila signed for NorthEast United FC, as their marquee player ahead of the inaugural Indian Super League season. He said: “India is a huge country and it should be a privilege for me to be a small part in popularising this global game here and working with the young talented footballers of North East India”. He started in the franchise's first match, a 1–0 win over the Kerala Blasters at the Indira Gandhi Athletic Stadium, being deployed by manager Ricki Herbert as a central defender. On 27 November, in a 3–0 home victory against league leaders Chennaiyin FC, he was sent off after 72 minutes for a second yellow card, as his team went on to rank in last position.

Capdevila changed countries again on 21 January 2015, joining Belgian Pro League's Lierse SK. In May, he suffered a knee injury in training, ruling him out for six months. He returned to the Iberian Peninsula on 1 June 2016, signing for FC Santa Coloma, champions of Andorra's Primera Divisió.

On 5 July 2017, the 39-year-old Capdevila announced his retirement.

International career
Capdevila played for Spain at the 2000 Summer Olympics, winning the silver medal and converting his penalty shootout attempt as his team lost the final to Cameroon. He made his debut for the full side on 16 October 2002 in a 0–0 friendly draw with Paraguay, scoring his first goal in an UEFA Euro 2008 qualifier against Sweden on 17 November 2007, a 3–0 win. Previously, he made the country's final squad for Euro 2004 as an injury replacement for Míchel Salgado, but did not leave the bench.

On 6 February 2008, Capdevila scored the winner in Spain's 1–0 victory over France in a friendly in Málaga. He was subsequently called up to the squad for Euro 2008, where he featured in all the games save one for the eventual champions. During the tournament he established himself as first choice, his clearance in the dying seconds against Sweden being a crucial part of David Villa's late winner to make the score 2–1; together with right-back Sergio Ramos and central defenders Carles Puyol and Carlos Marchena, he helped keep clean sheets during all three matches of the knock-out stages.

During the first game of the 2009 FIFA Confederations Cup on 14 June 2009, Capdevila set up Fernando Torres's third goal of his hat-trick, and also assisted for Cesc Fàbregas's second international goal as Spain thrashed New Zealand 5–0 – in fact, all five goals were created from the left wing, with him playing a crucial part in the Spanish attack. In the second game against Iraq, three days later, he assisted Villa's on his 55th-minute goal (the match's only), which allowed for a run to the semi-finals of the competition. Eventually he, Puyol, Villa and Torres were named in the team of the tournament, as the national side finished third. During the group stages of the competition, he provided the most assists (three) and made the joint second–highest number of solo runs (ten).

On 20 May 2010, after appearing in all the fixtures during the qualifying stages, contributing one goal in Spain's 4–0 home defeat of Armenia, Capdevila was selected by manager Vicente del Bosque to the squad for the 2010 FIFA World Cup, where he played all the games and minutes for the eventual champions, being the only member of the starting line-up for the final who was not a Real Madrid or FC Barcelona player, considering Villa had been signed by the latter days before the tournament. He was among the top ten players of the competition in terms of distance covered, having run 71.79 km.

Style of play
An offensive–minded left-sided full-back or wing-back, Capdevila was known for his speed and passing ability, which enabled him to get forward, make overlapping runs, provide width to his team and link-up with the attack. Regarded as one of the best left-backs in the world in his prime, although he was not as flashy as other players in his position, he was also known for his leadership and consistency as well as his defensive ability, although he was stronger in the offensive aspect of his game.

Awards, recognitions and distinctions 
 Gold Medal of the Royal Order of Sports Merit, awarded by the Higher Sports Council (2011)

Career statistics

Club

International

Scores and results list Spain's goal tally first, score column indicates score after each Capdevila goal.

Honours

Deportivo
Copa del Rey: 2001–02
Supercopa de España: 2002

Benfica
Taça da Liga: 2011–12

Santa Coloma
Primera Divisió: 2016–17

Spain U23
Summer Olympic silver medal: 2000

Spain
FIFA World Cup: 2010
UEFA European Championship: 2008
FIFA Confederations Cup third place: 2009

Individual
FIFA Confederations Cup FIFA.com Users' Top 11: 2009
FIFA World Cup All-Star Team: 2010

See also
 List of La Liga players (400+ appearances)

References

External links

 
 
 
 

1978 births
Living people
People from Tàrrega
Sportspeople from the Province of Lleida
Spanish footballers
Footballers from Catalonia
Association football defenders
La Liga players
Segunda División B players
Tercera División players
UE Tàrrega players
RCD Espanyol B footballers
RCD Espanyol footballers
Deportivo de La Coruña players
Atlético Madrid footballers
Villarreal CF players
Primeira Liga players
S.L. Benfica footballers
Indian Super League players
NorthEast United FC players
Indian Super League marquee players
Belgian Pro League players
Lierse S.K. players
FC Santa Coloma players
Spain under-21 international footballers
Spain under-23 international footballers
Spain international footballers
UEFA Euro 2004 players
UEFA Euro 2008 players
2009 FIFA Confederations Cup players
UEFA European Championship-winning players
2010 FIFA World Cup players
FIFA World Cup-winning players
Footballers at the 2000 Summer Olympics
Olympic footballers of Spain
Medalists at the 2000 Summer Olympics
Olympic silver medalists for Spain
Olympic medalists in football
Catalonia international footballers
Spanish expatriate footballers
Expatriate footballers in Portugal
Expatriate footballers in India
Expatriate footballers in Belgium
Expatriate footballers in Andorra
Spanish expatriate sportspeople in Portugal
Spanish expatriate sportspeople in India
Spanish expatriate sportspeople in Belgium
Spanish expatriate sportspeople in Andorra